The following is a partial list of Canadian soccer stadiums, in order by capacity. Not all stadiums are used exclusively for soccer; some also host Canadian football, rugby and/or track and field.

Current stadiums

Former stadiums

See also
List of Canadian Premier League stadiums
List of Major League Soccer stadiums
List of Canadian Football League stadiums
List of stadiums in Canada
List of indoor arenas in Canada
List of association football stadiums by capacity
Soccer-specific stadium

References

Canada